Joseph Lobendahn (born February 15, 1983) is a Canadian football linebacker of Samoan descent who is currently a free agent. He most recently played for the Saskatchewan Roughriders. He was signed by the club after being released by the Calgary Stampeders of the Canadian Football League. Joe joined the Calgary Stampeders during 2012 training camp but failed to win a spot with the linebacker unit.

He spent the previous four seasons with the Winnipeg Blue Bombers. Joe had a strong 2011 campaign until a serious knee injury put him on the Injured Reserve List in September.

He was originally signed by the Detroit Lions as an undrafted free agent in 2007. He played college football at Washington.

References

External links
Just Sports Stats

1983 births
Living people
Players of American football from Honolulu
Players of Canadian football from Honolulu
American players of Canadian football
Canadian football linebackers
American football linebackers
Washington Huskies football players
Spokane Shock players
Detroit Lions players
Winnipeg Blue Bombers players
Calgary Stampeders players
Saskatchewan Roughriders players
Players of American football from Hawaii
American sportspeople of Samoan descent
Saint Louis School alumni